Typhoon Halong, known in the Philippines as Typhoon Jose, was a  intense Typhoon in the Western Pacific basin in August 2014. It was the twelfth named storm and the fifth typhoon of the 2014 Pacific typhoon season. The storm reached its maximum intensity as a Category 5 super typhoon, making it the fifth strongest storm of the season, surpassed by Genevieve, Vongfong, Nuri and Hagupit.

Meteorological history

On July 26, JMA monitored a low-pressure area near Chuuk. The system stalled for a few days and was upgraded into a tropical depression on July 27. Early on July 29, the depression showed signs of intensification and with that, JTWC upgraded it to Tropical Storm 11W. Later that day, JMA upgraded 11W to Tropical Storm Halong. In the same time Halong started developing a small, unclear eye. With this, gale and typhoon force winds were reported over Guam.

Very late on July 30, JMA upgraded Halong to a severe tropical storm. The next day, both agencies upgraded it to a minimal typhoon. In the same time, Halong started its rapid deepening phase. On August 2, Halong's eye developed clearer than before as the system underwent explosive intensification from a category 1 typhoon to a Category 3 in less than 24 hours. Rapid deepening continued and it eventually became a category 5 super typhoon, with pressure dropping from 980 to 925 mbar in 48 hours. However, late that day, JMA revised Typhoon Halong's minimum pressure to 920 mbar. On August 4, Halong weakened to a category 4 typhoon, due to it undergoing an eyewall replacement cycle. The next day, Halong weakened to a minimal typhoon, although it was a deep typhoon due to its pressure. In the same day, its convection was steadily weakening.

On August 6, NASA reported that Halong was beginning undergo an eyewall replacement cycle. This made the JTWC upgrade it to a category 2 typhoon again. Its eye continued to undergo the eyewall replacement cycle until August 8. On the same day, Halong weakened to a category 1 typhoon and started to affect mainland Japan. The JTWC downgraded Halong to a tropical storm on August 9, while the JMA followed suit several hours later. Halong made landfall over the southern part of Japan prior to August 10. On August 10, JTWC issued their final bulletin on Halong, as it was leaving the country. The JMA also issued their final advisory on August 11, as it was becoming extratropical. Its remnants dissipated early on August 15 over Siberia, as it was absorbed by a developing extratropical system.

Preparations and impact

Philippines
In Subic, Zambales, 4 rescue boats were ready in case of flash floods. The Subic Public Order and Safety Office had also prepared rescue equipment for possible flooding.

Typhoon Halong was known in the Philippines as Typhoon Jose. On August 4, the NDRRMC warned residents of flood and landslide-prone areas in Luzon, to take precautions as Typhoon Halong would enhance the southwest monsoon. PAGASA also issued a gale warning in Luzon.

On August 7, 2 people were reported missing in Pangasinan, due to the enhanced monsoonal rains from Jose. They were reported dead on the next day. A total of nearly 16,000 people were affected by the enhanced monsoon. NDRRMC said that a total of ₱1.62 million (US$37,000) were from agricultural damages from the same province alone.

Although it did not made landfall in the Philippines, the name Jose was retired from its naming lists as it caused about P1.6 billion (US$36.3 million) in damage. PAGASA chose the name Josie to replace Jose.

Japan

The eye of Halong was located east of Daitō Islands on August 7, bringing typhoon-force winds over the islands. Later that day, the storm passed within  over an island. Early on August 9, Halong underwent a deep eyewall replacement cycle, just before landfall over mainland Japan. Later that day, it was reported that a 78-year-old man died in Iwate Prefecture due to heavy flooding. In the early-morning of August 10, Halong made landfall over Shikoku as a minimal typhoon, just before being downgraded as a severe tropical storm by the JMA. About 1.6 million people in Japan had to evacuate during the storm. In total, the storm is responsible for 10 deaths and 96 injuries. Agricultural damage in Okinawa, Kochi and Wakayama were calculated at around ¥3.72 billion (US$36.5 million).

See also

Typhoon Neoguri (2014)
Typhoon Roke (2011)
Typhoon Nangka (2015)
Typhoon Tokage (2004)
Typhoon Wipha (2013)
Typhoon Maemi

References

External links

JMA General Information of Typhoon Halong (1411) from Digital Typhoon

11W.HALONG from the U.S. Naval Research Laboratory

2014 Pacific typhoon season
2014 disasters in the Philippines
Typhoons in the Philippines
Typhoons in Japan
Typhoons in Russia
Halong
2014 disasters in Russia
Halong